Hexafluorophosphoric acid is the inorganic compound with the chemical formula  (also written ). This strong Brønsted acid features a non-coordinating anion, hexafluorophosphate. It is formed from the reaction of hydrogen fluoride with phosphorus pentafluoride.

Like many strong acids, hexafluorophosphoric acid is not isolable but is handled only in solution. It exothermically reacts with water to  produce oxonium hexafluorophosphate and hydrofluoric acid. Hexafluorophosphoric acid attacks glass. Upon heating, it decomposes to generate HF. Crystalline  has been obtained as the hexahydrate, wherein  is enclosed in truncated octahedral cages defined by the water and protons. NMR spectroscopy indicates that solutions derived from this hexahydrate contain significant amounts of HF.

See also
 Fluoroantimonic acid

References

Hexafluorophosphates
Mineral acids